The 1986–87 Pittsburgh Penguins season was the Penguins' 20th season in the National Hockey League (NHL). The Penguins did not qualify for the playoffs.

Offseason

Regular season

Final standings

Schedule and results

|- style="background:#cfc;"
| 1 || Oct 9 || Washington Capitals || 4–5 || Pittsburgh Penguins || Civic Arena || 1–0–0 || 2
|- style="background:#cfc;"
| 2 || Oct 11 || New York Rangers || 5–6 OT || Pittsburgh Penguins || Civic Arena || 2–0–0 || 4
|- style="background:#cfc;"
| 3 || Oct 12 || Pittsburgh Penguins || 4–1 || Chicago Blackhawks || Chicago Stadium || 3–0–0 || 6
|- style="background:#cfc;"
| 4 || Oct 14 || Los Angeles Kings || 3–4 OT || Pittsburgh Penguins || Civic Arena || 4–0–0 || 8
|- style="background:#cfc;"
| 5 || Oct 17 || Pittsburgh Penguins || 7–3 || Buffalo Sabres || Buffalo Memorial Auditorium || 5–0–0 || 10
|- style="background:#cfc;"
| 6 || Oct 18 || New Jersey Devils || 4–8 || Pittsburgh Penguins || Civic Arena || 6–0–0 || 12
|- style="background:#cfc;"
| 7 || Oct 22 || Buffalo Sabres || 4–5 OT || Pittsburgh Penguins || Civic Arena || 7–0–0 || 14
|- style="background:#fcf;"
| 8 || Oct 23 || Pittsburgh Penguins || 3–5 || Philadelphia Flyers || The Spectrum || 7–1–0 || 14
|- style="background:#cfc;"
| 9 || Oct 25 || Philadelphia Flyers || 2–4 || Pittsburgh Penguins || Civic Arena || 8–1–0 || 16
|- style="background:#fcf;"
| 10 || Oct 28 || Pittsburgh Penguins || 2–5 || Hartford Whalers || XL Center || 8–2–0 || 16
|- style="background:#fcf;"
| 11 || Oct 29 || New Jersey Devils || 8–6 || Pittsburgh Penguins || Civic Arena || 8–3–0 || 16
|-

|- style="background:#ffc;"
| 12 || Nov 1 || Pittsburgh Penguins || 3–3 OT || St. Louis Blues || The Checkerdome || 8–3–1 || 17
|- style="background:#ffc;"
| 13 || Nov 4 || Vancouver Canucks || 2–2 OT || Pittsburgh Penguins || Civic Arena || 8–3–2 || 18
|- style="background:#cfc;"
| 14 || Nov 8 || Pittsburgh Penguins || 4–2 || Minnesota North Stars || Met Center || 9–3–2 || 20
|- style="background:#fcf;"
| 15 || Nov 9 || Pittsburgh Penguins || 1–2 || Detroit Red Wings || Joe Louis Arena || 9–4–2 || 20
|- style="background:#cfc;"
| 16 || Nov 12 || Boston Bruins || 1–2 || Pittsburgh Penguins || Civic Arena || 10–4–2 || 22
|- style="background:#fcf;"
| 17 || Nov 14 || Pittsburgh Penguins || 4–5 || New Jersey Devils || Izod Center || 10–5–2 || 22
|- style="background:#cfc;"
| 18 || Nov 15 || Quebec Nordiques || 2–5 || Pittsburgh Penguins || Civic Arena || 11–5–2 || 24
|- style="background:#fcf;"
| 19 || Nov 18 || Pittsburgh Penguins || 1–3 || Winnipeg Jets || Winnipeg Arena || 11–6–2 || 24
|- style="background:#cfc;"
| 20 || Nov 20 || Pittsburgh Penguins || 5–2 || Calgary Flames || Scotiabank Saddledome || 12–6–2 || 26
|- style="background:#cfc;"
| 21 || Nov 22 || Pittsburgh Penguins || 5–4 || Washington Capitals || Capital Centre || 13–6–2 || 28
|- style="background:#fcf;"
| 22 || Nov 25 || Pittsburgh Penguins || 1–5 || New York Islanders || Nassau Veterans Memorial Coliseum || 13–7–2 || 28
|- style="background:#fcf;"
| 23 || Nov 26 || New York Islanders || 3–2 || Pittsburgh Penguins || Civic Arena || 13–8–2 || 28
|- style="background:#ffc;"
| 24 || Nov 29 || New York Rangers || 5–5 OT || Pittsburgh Penguins || Civic Arena || 13–8–3 || 29
|- style="background:#ffc;"
| 25 || Nov 30 || Pittsburgh Penguins || 2–2 OT || New York Rangers || Madison Square Garden (IV) || 13–8–4 || 30
|-

|- style="background:#fcf;"
| 26 || Dec 5 || Edmonton Oilers || 4–2 || Pittsburgh Penguins || Civic Arena || 13–9–4 || 30
|- style="background:#cfc;"
| 27 || Dec 6 || Minnesota North Stars || 2–5 || Pittsburgh Penguins || Civic Arena || 14–9–4 || 32
|- style="background:#fcf;"
| 28 || Dec 10 || Calgary Flames || 6–4 || Pittsburgh Penguins || Civic Arena || 14–10–4 || 32
|- style="background:#cfc;"
| 29 || Dec 12 || Toronto Maple Leafs || 3–8 || Pittsburgh Penguins || Civic Arena || 15–10–4 || 34
|- style="background:#fcf;"
| 30 || Dec 13 || Pittsburgh Penguins || 2–3 OT || Toronto Maple Leafs || Maple Leaf Gardens || 15–11–4 || 34
|- style="background:#fcf;"
| 31 || Dec 17 || Pittsburgh Penguins || 0–3 || Los Angeles Kings || The Forum || 15–12–4 || 34
|- style="background:#fcf;"
| 32 || Dec 20 || Philadelphia Flyers || 6–4 || Pittsburgh Penguins || Civic Arena || 15–13–4 || 34
|- style="background:#ffc;"
| 33 || Dec 22 || Pittsburgh Penguins || 4–4 OT || Montreal Canadiens || Montreal Forum || 15–13–5 || 35
|- style="background:#fcf;"
| 34 || Dec 23 || Pittsburgh Penguins || 3–4 OT || New York Islanders || Nassau Veterans Memorial Coliseum || 15–14–5 || 35
|- style="background:#ffc;"
| 35 || Dec 26 || Pittsburgh Penguins || 3–3 OT || Buffalo Sabres || Buffalo Memorial Auditorium || 15–14–6 || 36
|- style="background:#ffc;"
| 36 || Dec 27 || New York Islanders || 3–3 OT || Pittsburgh Penguins || Civic Arena || 15–14–7 || 37
|- style="background:#fcf;"
| 37 || Dec 30 || New York Rangers || 5–3 || Pittsburgh Penguins || Civic Arena || 15–15–7 || 37
|-

|- style="background:#fcf;"
| 38 || Jan 1 || Pittsburgh Penguins || 3–4 OT || Washington Capitals || Capital Centre || 15–16–7 || 37
|- style="background:#cfc;"
| 39 || Jan 3 || Montreal Canadiens || 3–6 || Pittsburgh Penguins || Civic Arena || 16–16–7 || 39
|- style="background:#cfc;"
| 40 || Jan 7 || Washington Capitals || 2–5 || Pittsburgh Penguins || Civic Arena || 17–16–7 || 41
|- style="background:#fcf;"
| 41 || Jan 9 || Pittsburgh Penguins || 2–3 || Washington Capitals || Capital Centre || 17–17–7 || 41
|- style="background:#ffc;"
| 42 || Jan 13 || Pittsburgh Penguins || 3–3 OT || New York Islanders || Nassau Veterans Memorial Coliseum || 17–17–8 || 42
|- style="background:#fcf;"
| 43 || Jan 14 || Winnipeg Jets || 4–3 || Pittsburgh Penguins || Civic Arena || 17–18–8 || 42
|- style="background:#fcf;"
| 44 || Jan 17 || Pittsburgh Penguins || 2–4 || Boston Bruins || Boston Garden || 17–19–8 || 42
|- style="background:#fcf;"
| 45 || Jan 18 || Detroit Red Wings || 1–0 || Pittsburgh Penguins || Civic Arena || 17–20–8 || 42
|- style="background:#fcf;"
| 46 || Jan 21 || Pittsburgh Penguins || 5–10 || Los Angeles Kings || The Forum || 17–21–8 || 42
|- style="background:#cfc;"
| 47 || Jan 23 || Pittsburgh Penguins || 6–0 || Vancouver Canucks || Pacific Coliseum || 18–21–8 || 44
|- style="background:#fcf;"
| 48 || Jan 24 || Pittsburgh Penguins || 2–4 || Edmonton Oilers || Northlands Coliseum || 18–22–8 || 44
|- style="background:#cfc;"
| 49 || Jan 27 || Washington Capitals || 5–7 || Pittsburgh Penguins || Civic Arena || 19–22–8 || 46
|- style="background:#fcf;"
| 50 || Jan 29 || Pittsburgh Penguins || 3–5 || Philadelphia Flyers || The Spectrum || 19–23–8 || 46
|-

|- style="background:#fcf;"
| 51 || Feb 1 || Hartford Whalers || 8–6 || Pittsburgh Penguins || Civic Arena || 19–24–8 || 46
|- style="background:#fcf;"
| 52 || Feb 5 || Pittsburgh Penguins || 5–6 || Boston Bruins || Boston Garden || 19–25–8 || 46
|- style="background:#cfc;"
| 53 || Feb 7 || Chicago Blackhawks || 1–4 || Pittsburgh Penguins || Civic Arena || 20–25–8 || 48
|- style="background:#cfc;"
| 54 || Feb 8 || Pittsburgh Penguins || 2–1 OT || New Jersey Devils || Izod Center || 21–25–8 || 50
|- style="background:#ffc;"
| 55 || Feb 14 || Vancouver Canucks || 3–3 OT || Pittsburgh Penguins || Civic Arena || 21–25–9 || 51
|- style="background:#fcf;"
| 56 || Feb 15 || Pittsburgh Penguins || 1–4 || New York Rangers || Madison Square Garden (IV) || 21–26–9 || 51
|- style="background:#fcf;"
| 57 || Feb 17 || Calgary Flames || 3–1 || Pittsburgh Penguins || Civic Arena || 21–27–9 || 51
|- style="background:#ffc;"
| 58 || Feb 19 || Pittsburgh Penguins || 4–4 OT || Philadelphia Flyers || The Spectrum || 21–27–10 || 52
|- style="background:#fcf;"
| 59 || Feb 21 || New Jersey Devils || 6–5 || Pittsburgh Penguins || Civic Arena || 21–28–10 || 52
|- style="background:#cfc;"
| 60 || Feb 22 || Pittsburgh Penguins || 4–2 || New York Rangers || Madison Square Garden (IV) || 22–28–10 || 54
|- style="background:#cfc;"
| 61 || Feb 24 || Edmonton Oilers || 2–5 || Pittsburgh Penguins || Civic Arena || 23–28–10 || 56
|- style="background:#fcf;"
| 62 || Feb 26 || Pittsburgh Penguins || 4–5 || New York Islanders || Nassau Veterans Memorial Coliseum || 23–29–10 || 56
|- style="background:#fcf;"
| 63 || Feb 28 || Chicago Blackhawks || 2–1 || Pittsburgh Penguins || Civic Arena || 23–30–10 || 56
|-

|- style="background:#ffc;"
| 64 || Mar 1 || St. Louis Blues || 5–5 OT || Pittsburgh Penguins || Civic Arena || 23–30–11 || 57
|- style="background:#cfc;"
| 65 || Mar 3 || Pittsburgh Penguins || 8–1 || Quebec Nordiques || Quebec Coliseum || 24–30–11 || 59
|- style="background:#fcf;"
| 66 || Mar 5 || Pittsburgh Penguins || 2–7 || Toronto Maple Leafs || Maple Leaf Gardens || 24–31–11 || 59
|- style="background:#cfc;"
| 67 || Mar 7 || Pittsburgh Penguins || 7–3 || Minnesota North Stars || Met Center || 25–31–11 || 61
|- style="background:#cfc;"
| 68 || Mar 8 || Pittsburgh Penguins || 5–3 || Winnipeg Jets || Winnipeg Arena || 26–31–11 || 63
|- style="background:#fcf;"
| 69 || Mar 10 || New York Islanders || 6–3 || Pittsburgh Penguins || Civic Arena || 26–32–11 || 63
|- style="background:#cfc;"
| 70 || Mar 12 || Quebec Nordiques || 3–6 || Pittsburgh Penguins || Civic Arena || 27–32–11 || 65
|- style="background:#fcf;"
| 71 || Mar 14 || New York Rangers || 3–2 OT || Pittsburgh Penguins || Civic Arena || 27–33–11 || 65
|- style="background:#cfc;"
| 72 || Mar 18 || St. Louis Blues || 4–5 || Pittsburgh Penguins || Civic Arena || 28–33–11 || 67
|- style="background:#fcf;"
| 73 || Mar 20 || Pittsburgh Penguins || 3–4 || Washington Capitals || Capital Centre || 28–34–11 || 67
|- style="background:#fcf;"
| 74 || Mar 22 || Pittsburgh Penguins || 1–3 || Philadelphia Flyers || The Spectrum || 28–35–11 || 67
|- style="background:#ffc;"
| 75 || Mar 24 || Philadelphia Flyers || 3–3 OT || Pittsburgh Penguins || Civic Arena || 28–35–12 || 68
|- style="background:#fcf;"
| 76 || Mar 28 || Pittsburgh Penguins || 4–5 || Hartford Whalers || XL Center || 28–36–12 || 68
|- style="background:#fcf;"
| 77 || Mar 29 || Montreal Canadiens || 4–1 || Pittsburgh Penguins || Civic Arena || 28–37–12 || 68
|- style="background:#fcf;"
| 78 || Mar 31 || Pittsburgh Penguins || 3–5 || New Jersey Devils || Izod Center || 28–38–12 || 68
|-

|- style="background:#cfc;"
| 79 || Apr 2 || New Jersey Devils || 2–6 || Pittsburgh Penguins || Civic Arena || 29–38–12 || 70
|- style="background:#cfc;"
| 80 || Apr 4 || Detroit Red Wings || 3–4 OT || Pittsburgh Penguins || Civic Arena || 30–38–12 || 72
|-

|- style="text-align:center;"
| Legend:       = Win       = Loss       = Tie

Playoffs
Despite a strong start at the beginning of the season, the Penguins managed to find themselves unqualified for the playoffs for the fifth straight year.

Player statistics
Skaters

Goaltenders

†Denotes player acquired mid-season.  Stats reflect time with the Penguins only.
‡Denotes player was traded mid-season.  Stats reflect time with the Penguins only.

Awards and records
 Mario Lemieux established a new franchise record for goals in a season with 54, besting the previous high of 53 held by Pierre Larouche (1976).

Transactions

The Penguins were involved in the following transactions during the 1986–87 season:

Trades

Additions and subtractions

Draft picks

Farm teams

See also
1986–87 NHL season

References

External links

Pitts
Pitts
Pittsburgh Penguins seasons
Pitts
Pitts